Heliogomphus is a genus of dragonflies in the family Gomphidae.

The genus contains the following species:
Heliogomphus bakeri 
Heliogomphus blandulus 
Heliogomphus borneensis 
Heliogomphus cervus 
Heliogomphus ceylonicus  – Sri Lanka grappletail
Heliogomphus chaoi 
Heliogomphus drescheri 
Heliogomphus gracilis 
Heliogomphus kalarensis 
Heliogomphus kelantanensis 
Heliogomphus lieftincki 
Heliogomphus lyratus 
Heliogomphus nietneri 
Heliogomphus olivaceus 
Heliogomphus promelas 
Heliogomphus retroflexus 
Heliogomphus scorpio 
Heliogomphus selysi 
Heliogomphus spirillus 
Heliogomphus svihleri 
Heliogomphus walli  – Wall's grappletail

References

Gomphidae
Anisoptera genera
Taxonomy articles created by Polbot